Eze Eberechi N. Dick  is a Nigerian monarch. He is the Eze Udo I of Mgboko Ngwa Amaise Kingdom in Obingwa Local Government Area of Abia State. He served as Chairman of Abia State Traditional Rulers Council from 2013 to 2019 and Chairman South-East Council of Traditional Rulers from 2015 to 2020. He served as the chancellor Federal University of Technology, Minna from 2018 to 2021 and currently the chancellor of Federal University of Agriculture, Zuru.

References 

Living people
Nigerian traditional rulers
Igbo monarchs
Year of birth missing (living people)